Pseudexentera mali, commonly known as the pale apple leafroller or pale apple budworm, is a species of tortricid moth in the family Tortricidae.

The MONA or Hodges number for Pseudexentera mali is 3247.

References

Further reading

 

Eucosmini